The Lianyungang–Xuzhou high-speed railway (Chinese: 连徐客运专线) is a high-speed railway in China.

The railway runs parallel to the Longhai railway and interchanges with it at Lianyungang and Donghaixian. It is the eastern-most section of the Eurasia Continental Bridge corridor.

History
Construction began on 6 November 2016. The railway, excluding Daxu South, opened on 8 February 2021.

Stations
Xuzhou East (interchange with the Beijing–Shanghai high-speed railway, Zhengzhou–Xuzhou high-speed railway, and Xuzhou–Yancheng high-speed railway)
Daxu South
Pizhou East
Xinyi South
Donghaixian (interchange with the Longhai railway)
Lianyungang (interchange with the Qingdao–Yancheng railway and Longhai railway)

References

High-speed railway lines in China
Railway lines opened in 2021